This article lists different records related to Mount Everest. One of the most commonly sought after records is a "summit", to reach the highest elevation point on Mount Everest.

Records

Highest number of times to reach the summit

Other number of times records

Most times per nation

First to summit a certain number of times

Double summiting records

Fastest ascents

*Pemba Dorje's Everest record has now been rejected by the Nepal Supreme Court, the Nepal Ministry of Tourism, and Guinness World Records.

Deadliest accident

Oldest summiters
This table shows the progression of the record for oldest male summiter, as well as some additional examples of aged summiters for comparison

Tenzing Norgay was older than his climbing partner Sir Edmund Hillary, as the first confirmed climbers to reach the summit, they became the modern-day starting point for the oldest and youngest climbers respectively.

This table shows the progression of the record for oldest female summiter.

Junko Tabei was the first woman to reach the summit, and thus set the initial records for both oldest and youngest female summiter.

Youngest summiters
Due to some variations in record keeping, there may be some variation in the examples.

Youngest female

See also 
Nimdoma Sherpa 
Samantha Larson
Nima Chhamzi Sherpa, summited May 19, 2012 at the age of 16.

Firsts

Disabled summiters

Other 

Elizabeth Hawley, has kept records for Everest from 1960s to at least 2015. (She died in January 2018 at age 94)
Nations with most summits, U.K - 481 as of 2011.

Skydives Over Mount Everest

Nepali records

Many Mount Everest records are held by Nepali, especially those from the Sherpa region.

On 11 May 2011, Apa Sherpa successfully reached the summit of Everest for the twenty-first time, breaking his own record for the most successful ascents. He first climbed Mount Everest in 1989 at the age of 29. 
Phurba Tashi Sherpa (also 21 times)
Kami Rita Sherpa (24 times by 2019)
One famous Nepalese female mountaineer was Pasang Lhamu Sherpa, the first Nepali female climber to reach the summit of Everest, but who died during the descent. Another well-known woman Sherpa was the two-time Everest summiter Pemba Doma Sherpa, who died after falling from Lhotse on 22 May 2007.
Nepali mountaineer Lhakpa Sherpa, the first Nepali female climber to reach the summit of Everest and descend from it, has stood atop of Everest 7 times by 2016 and 8 times by 2017, the most times for woman.
Nima Jangmu Sherpa, 28, made the historic ascent on Mount Kanchenjunga on 23 May 2018 morning and became the only woman in the world to climb Nepal's three highest peaks (Mount Everest -14 May 2018, Mount Lhotse - 29 April 2018, Mount Kanchenjunga – 23 May 2018) above 8,000 metres in a single season within 25 days.  She has also become the only Nepali woman to stand atop the world's third highest peak, Mount Kanchenjunga.

Other examples of noted Nepali Everest mountaineers:
Temba Tsheri
Nima Chhamzi Sherpa
Nimdoma Sherpa
Ming Kipa
Chhurim

About names: Many Nepalese are only given one name, and are often named for a day of the week

One source of confusion was in record keeping was that the South side was essentially closed in 2014 due to an avalanche disrupting the Khumbu Icefall. So most of the summiters summited from the North side, except for a small group that flew a helicopter over the Khumbu Icefall, even though it was not open. This is why in 2016 Adrian Ballinger said on Instagram "9 Sherpa using supplemental oxygen became the first to summit on the South Side of Everest in the past 3 years" in 2016. The full Nepal route to the summit was not open in 2014 or in 2015, but there was a group that summited from the south side in 2014 as part of a Chinese team that used a helicopter to reach that area.

Most summits in one day
For the mountain overall, the most in one day is May 23, 2019 when 358 reached the top. The previous record was May 19, 2012 when 179-234  reached the top.

Everest base camp records
Records for non-summits such about the main Nepal-side Base camp:

Some Everest-related marathons that start at Base camp or near Everest include the Everest Marathon, Tenzing Hillary Everest Marathon, and the Mount Everest Challenge Marathon.

Death statistics

See also
The Himalayan Database
List of Mount Everest expeditions
List of 20th-century summiters of Mount Everest
List of Mount Everest summiters by number of times to the summit
List of people who died climbing Mount Everest
2014 Nepal snowstorm disaster
List of ski descents of Eight-Thousanders#Mount Everest

Notes
1.Kazi Sherpa used supplemental oxygen on the descent.

References

External links
A History of Mt. Everest Speed Climbing Records/Claims, by Dan Howitt
Ascent statistics CBC (goes to 2010)
Adventure stats for age up to 2002
8000ers statistics

Records
Nepal-related lists
Climbing and mountaineering-related lists
Mountaineering disasters
Mountaineering deaths